Maanvi Gagroo  is an Indian actress who appears in Hindi films and television, She has worked in various web series like TVF Pitchers, TVF Tripling and Four More Shots Please!.

Personal Life and background
Maanvi Gagroo was born in Kashmiri Pandit family to Surender and Urmil Gagroo in New Delhi. She went to The Mother's International School, New Delhi and earned her bachelor’s degree in psychology from Gargi College, University of Delhi. Maanvi married Kumar Varun on 23 February 2023 in a private ceremony.

Career
Gagroo began her career with the Disney Channel's television show Dhoom Machaao Dhoom in 2007. She is known for her work in web series like TVF Pitchers, TVF Tripling, Made in Heaven and Four More Shots Please!. In 2019, she portrayed the character of 'Apsara', a plus size woman in a comedy movie Ujda Chaman opposite Sunny Singh, for which she wore a fat suit. She has worked with Ayushmann Khurrana in  Shubh Mangal Zyada Saavdhan. The film deals with the subject of same-sex love and Maanvi played the role of a 'quirky bride'.

Filmography

Films

Television

References

External links

Living people
Year of birth missing (living people)
Indian film actresses
Actresses from New Delhi
Gargi College alumni